Mount McKibben is a mountain standing  southwest of Hansen Inlet and  southeast of McCaw Ridge, near the base of the Antarctic Peninsula. It was mapped by the United States Geological Survey from surveys and U.S. Navy air photos, 1961–67, and was named by the Advisory Committee on Antarctic Names for L.D. McKibben, U.S. Navy, a shipfitter with the South Pole Station winter party in 1963.

References

Mountains of Palmer Land